Crows Nest railway station is a future underground rapid transit station, to be built beneath Crows Nest as part of Transport for New South Wales' Sydney Metro City & Southwest scheme. It is scheduled to open in 2024.

References

External links
Crows Nest station Sydney Metro

Proposed railway stations in Sydney

Railway stations scheduled to open in 2024